Kensington Park may refer to:

Australia
 Kensington Park, South Australia, a suburb of Adelaide
Canada
 Kensington Park (Burnaby), a park in Burnaby, a suburb of Vancouver, British Columbia
Jamaica
 Kensington Park (Kingston), a cricket ground in Kingston
New Zealand
 Kensington Park, Orewa, a subdivision the northern town of Orewa
United Kingdom
 Kensington Park, Bristol, a district
 Kensington Park, London, a 19th-century designation for a London residential district now subsumed within Notting Hill
 Kensington Park School, an independent school in London
 Kensington Gardens, a park in London
United States
 Kensington Park, California
 Kensington Park, former name of Kensington, California
 Kensington Park, Florida, a census-designated place
 Kensington Metropark, Michigan